Ride Me Back Home is the 69th solo studio album by American country music singer-songwriter Willie Nelson. It was released on June 21, 2019, by Legacy Recordings. Its title track earned Nelson his ninth Grammy Award, winning in the category Best Country Solo Performance.

Background
During an interview on Sirius XM Satellite Radio, aired on April 13, 2019 Nelson announced the release of the album. The material consists mostly of original writings by producer Buddy Cannon and Nelson. Meanwhile, the title track was written by Sonny Throckmorton. Nelson decided to record "Ride Me Back Home" for his own advocacy for horses. On Cannon's suggestion, a revisited version of "Stay Away from Lonely Places" from 1972's The Words Don't Fit the Picture was included.

The first single, its title track, was released on April 26, 2019. Ride Me Back Home completed the "Mortality Trilogy" of Nelson, complementing God's Problem Child and Last Man Standing.

Commercial performance
Ride Me Back Home debuted at No. 2 on Billboards Top Country Albums with 19,000 album equivalent units. The album has sold 58,900 copies in the United States as of March 2020.

Track listing

Charts

Weekly charts

Year-end charts

References

External links

Willie Nelson albums
2019 albums
Albums produced by Buddy Cannon
Legacy Recordings albums